Hal Buell was the former head of the Photography Service (photography director) at the Associated Press for twenty-five years where he supervised an international staff of 300 photographers. He is also the author of Moments: The Pulitzer Prize-Winning Photographs and Uncommon Valor, Common Virtue, a book about war photographer Joe Rosenthal.

Education
He is a graduate of the Medill School of Journalism at Northwestern University.

Career
Buell has worked in photojournalism for forty years. He is known as one of the most active archivists of the twentieth and twenty first century and has lectured throughout the world. His editing work has helped define print coverage around the world. Buell Also published a number of children's photo books on Japan and Asia after living there on assignment in the 1960s. He has worked in more than thirty-five countries. Photographs taken by others and edited by Buell have appeared on CNN and BBC. He has also produced film documentaries which have appeared on the History Channel.

References

External links
National Public Radio (NPR) Interview
The Unsung Hero of Iwo Jima (article by Hal Buell about Bill Genaust,  a filmmaker who covered Iwo Jima)
Interview with Hal Buell at Takegreatpictures.com

Year of birth missing (living people)
Living people
American photojournalists
Medill School of Journalism alumni
Associated Press photographers